Apliu Street is a street in the Sham Shui Po area of Kowloon, Hong Kong.

Location
Apliu Street runs parallel to Cheung Sha Wan Road between Yen Chow Street and Nam Cheong Street. An easy way to reach it is to get off at the MTR Sham Shui Po station. Use the A2 or C2 exit and you will be ascending directly into Apliu Street.

Name
The Cantonese name "apliu" (鴨寮) comes from a village which was formerly located nearby but has long since been buried underneath the urbanization of Sham Shui Po.

Retail
Apliu Street is home to a bustling street market selling electronics, electrical components, and related items. A shopper can find both new and used merchandise in the area. Apliu Street is well known for geek shopping, and at one time it had an unsavoury reputation as a "thieves' market".

While Apliu Street is famous for electronic parts, the Golden Shopping Arcade on the opposite side of Cheung Sha Wan Road is famous for computer hardware, video games, and related items.

Trivia

The shop Kong Wah Telecom (HK) Limited (near the junction of Kweilin Street) was a site of the Detour in the eleventh leg of the reality TV show The Amazing Race 27.

See also
Shia Wong Hip, a restaurant specialising in snake dishes located on Apliu Street
List of streets and roads in Hong Kong

References

External links

Hong Kong map

Sham Shui Po
Odonyms referring to a building
Street markets in Hong Kong
Electronics districts
Roads in New Kowloon